Ballade in the Form of Variations on a Norwegian Folk Song in G minor, Op. 24, is a large-scale work for piano by Edvard Grieg. It is in the form of theme and variations, the theme being the Norwegian folk song Den nordlanske bondestand (The Northland Peasantry in English). A performance usually lasts around 20 minutes.

 Theme. The theme is first introduced in  time. It is marked andante espressivo. The theme is haunting and sad, and has much lyrical beauty.
 Variation I. The first variation marked poco meno andante, ma molto tranquillo, introduces the harmonic chord pattern in triplets.
 Variation II. The second variation branches of the first and is marked allegro agitato. This variation requires much virtuosity, having daring jumps in the left hand. The chord patterns are the same as the first variation.
 Variation III. The third variation in contrast to the preceding agitato, is a calm adagio marked molto espressivo. It is a slow movement that introduces a new melody very similar to the theme, but darker.
 Variation IV. The fourth variation is a lively allegro capriccioso. It consists of brisk descending chromatic sixteenth notes, with chords in the left hand, still resembling the harmonic changes in the theme.
 Variation V. The fifth variation marked più lento, is unlike the entire song. It consists of huge, but slow, arpeggios followed by a variation of the theme. This variation produces an intense feeling of sorrow and loneliness.
 Variation VI. The sixth variation marked allegro scherzando, is a technically difficult variation based on jumping chords passing from hand to hand. Still the chord progressions are the same as the theme.
 Variation VII. The seventh variation is the same as the sixth, but more sustained, and instead of chords, arpeggios, but still in the same fashion of passing from hand to hand.
 Variation VIII. The eighth variation is marked lento, and is another form of the theme melody played in chords.
 Variation IX. The ninth variation is marked un poco andante, and is perhaps the most creative of the variations. It is similar to the eight, but more agitated, and doesn't have the same hypnotic flow.
 Variation X. The tenth variation starts the buildup to the climax with an un poco allegro e alla burla tempo.
 Variation XI. The eleventh variation marked piu animato is a fast preparatory variation, still leading to the coda.
 Variation XII. The twelfth variation is marked meno allegro e maestoso, and is a huge grand variation of con tutta forza, with massive chords and repeats the melody heard in the third variation, only in a grand major voice.
 Variation XIII. The thirteenth variation is marked allegro furioso is the final buildup to the huge climax. It consists of virtuosic arpeggiated chords, and octaves flying all over the keyboard.
 Variation XIV. The final variation, fourteen, is a huge prestissimo. The theme is pounded in fast octave chords, and climbs up the keyboard. Ends with a low e flat octave, marked lunga with a fermata.
 Coda. The theme is finally closed, with a flashback of the first 8 measures, and closes with a G minor chord.

The Ballade was one of the works played by Percy Grainger at his 1901 London debut at Steinway Hall.  This was four years before he met Grieg, who was to become Grainger's greatest champion.

The Norwegian composer Geirr Tveitt made an arrangement of the Ballade for orchestra, which, thought to be lost for several years, was found in the early 1990s.

References

Compositions by Edvard Grieg
Variations
1876 compositions
Compositions in G minor
Compositions using folk songs
Piano ballades